Al-Amour is a sub-district located in Al Haymah Al Kharijiyah District, Sana'a Governorate, Yemen. Al-Amour had a population of 985 according to the 2004 census.

References 

Sub-districts in Al Haymah Al Kharijiyah District